In mathematics, a locally integrable function (sometimes also called locally summable function) is a function which is integrable (so its integral is finite) on every compact subset of its domain of definition. The importance of such functions lies in the fact that their function space is similar to  spaces, but its members are not required to satisfy any growth restriction on their behavior at the boundary of their domain (at infinity if the domain is unbounded): in other words, locally integrable functions can grow arbitrarily fast at the domain boundary, but are still manageable in a way similar to ordinary integrable functions.

Definition

Standard definition
. Let  be an open set in  the Euclidean space  and   be a Lebesgue measurable function.

The set of all such functions is denoted by :

The classical definition of a locally integrable function involves only measure theoretic and topological concepts and can be carried over abstract to complex-valued functions on a topological measure space : however, since the most common application of such functions is to distribution theory on Euclidean spaces, all the definitions in this and the following sections deal explicitly only with this important case.

An alternative definition
. Let  be an open set in the Euclidean space . Then a function  such that

This "distribution theoretic" definition is equivalent to the standard one, as the following lemma proves:

.

Proof of 
If part:  Let  be a test function. It is bounded by its supremum norm , measurable, and has a compact support, let's call it . Hence

Only if part: Let  be a compact subset of the open set .

hence it is possible to choose a real number  such that  (if  is the empty set, take ). They are likewise compact and satisfy

Now use convolution to define the function  by

where  is a mollifier constructed by using the standard positive symmetric one. Since  for all , we have that .

Then

Generalization: locally p-integrable functions
. Let  be an open set in  the Euclidean space  and   be a Lebesgue measurable function.

The set of all such functions is denoted by :

An alternative definition, completely analogous to the one given for locally integrable functions, can also be given for locally -integrable functions: it can also be and proven equivalent to the one in this section. Despite their apparent higher generality, locally -integrable functions form a subset of locally integrable functions for every  such that .

Notation 
Apart from the different glyphs which may be used for the uppercase "L", there are few variants for the notation of the set of locally integrable functions

Properties

Lp,loc is a complete metric space for all p ≥ 1
.  is a complete metrizable space: its topology can be generated by the following metric:

where  is a family of non empty open sets such that
 , meaning that  is compactly included in  i.e. it is a set having compact closure strictly included in the set of higher index.
 .
 , k ∈  is an indexed family of seminorms, defined as

Lp is a subspace of L1,loc for all p ≥ 1
.

Proof. The case  is trivial, therefore in the sequel of the proof it is assumed that .

where
 is a positive number such that  =  for a given 
 is the Lebesgue measure of the compact set 

therefore

Note that since the following inequality is true

the theorem is true also for functions  belonging only to the space of locally -integrable functions, therefore the theorem implies also the following result.

.

Note: If  is an open subset of  that is also bounded, then one has the standard inclusion  which makes sense given the above inclusion . But the first of these statements is not true if  is not bounded; then it is still true that  for any , but not that .

L1,loc is the space of densities of absolutely continuous measures

. A function  is the density of an absolutely continuous measure if and only if .

Rephrasing its statement, this theorem asserts that every locally integrable function defines an absolutely continuous measure and conversely that every absolutely continuous measures defines a locally integrable function: this is also, in the abstract measure theory framework, the form of the important Radon–Nikodym theorem given by Stanisław Saks in his treatise.

Examples
The constant function  defined on the real line is locally integrable but not globally integrable since the real line has infinite measure. More generally, constants, continuous functions and integrable functions are locally integrable.
The function  for x ∈ (0, 1) is locally but not globally integrable on (0, 1). It is locally integrable since any compact set K ⊆ (0, 1) has positive distance from 0 and f is hence bounded on K. This example underpins the initial claim that locally integrable functions do not require the satisfaction of growth conditions near the boundary in bounded domains.
 The function

 is not locally integrable in : it is indeed locally integrable near this point since its integral over every compact set not including it is finite. Formally speaking, ( \ 0): however, this function can be extended to a distribution on the whole  as a Cauchy principal value.
 The preceding example raises a question: does every function which is locally integrable in  ⊊  admit an extension to the whole  as a distribution? The answer is negative, and a counterexample is provided by the following function:
 
 The following example, similar to the preceding one, is a function belonging to ( \ 0) which serves as an elementary counterexample in the application of the theory of distributions to differential operators with irregular singular coefficients:
 

Applications 

Locally integrable functions play a prominent role in distribution theory and they occur in the definition of various classes of functions and function spaces, like functions of bounded variation. Moreover, they appear in the Radon–Nikodym theorem by characterizing the absolutely continuous part of every measure.

See also 
Compact set
Distribution (mathematics)
Lebesgue's density theorem
Lebesgue differentiation theorem
Lebesgue integral
Lp space

Notes

References
. Measure and integration (as the English translation of the title reads) is a definitive monograph on integration and measure theory: the treatment of the limiting behavior of the integral of various kind of sequences of measure-related structures (measurable functions, measurable sets, measures and their combinations) is somewhat conclusive.
. Translated from the original 1958 Russian edition by Eugene Saletan, this is an important monograph on the theory of generalized functions, dealing both with distributions and analytic functionals.
.
 (available also as ).
 (available also as ).
.
.
.
.
. English translation by Laurence Chisholm Young, with two additional notes by Stefan Banach: the Mathematical Reviews number refers to the Dover Publications 1964 edition, which is basically a reprint.
.
.
. A monograph on the theory of generalized functions written with an eye towards their applications to several complex variables and mathematical physics, as is customary for the Author.

External links 

Measure theory
Integral calculus
Types of functions
Lp spaces